Chepes Airport  is a public use airport located 1 nm south of Chepes, La Rioja, Argentina.

See also
List of airports in Argentina

References

External links 
 Airport record for Chepes Airport at Landings.com

Airports in La Rioja Province, Argentina